HMS Orpheus was a 32–gun fifth rate frigate of the Royal Navy. She was launched in 1780, and served for more than a quarter of a century, before she was wrecked in 1807.

American War of Independence
The Royal Navy briefly took her into service as HMS Confederate.

In March 1782, Orpheus captured the American letter of marque Navarro.

French Revolutionary Wars
1792  Orpheus sailed to the leeward Island under the command of Captain Henry Newcombe,  1793 sailed to the East Indies.
On 5 May 1794, Orpheus captured the French frigate Duguay Trouin, the former East Indiaman Princess Royal, which the French had captured on 27 September 1793.

On 22 June 1796 Orpheus was in the Straits of Banca, where she captured the Dutch brig Harlingen.

In August 1797 Orpheus was reported as being in Madras and Captain William Hill was appointed commander.

Napoleonic Wars
On 16 April 1806, Orpheus, Captain Thomas Briggs, was in company with the revenue cutter . They shared in the proceeds of the capture of two merchant vessels, Vrou Fingina and Vyf Gesusters.

Fate
Orpheus, under the command of Captain Thomas Briggs, arrived off Jamaica from England in the evening of 22 January 1807. Being short of water, Briggs decided to try to sail her into Port Royal, rather than wait for a pilot. Around midnight Orpheus grounded on a reef that was not accurately marked on her charts. Efforts to lighten her failed and she took on water. When the water reached her main deck, the crew took to the boats, abandoning her.

Notes, citations and references
Notes

Citations

References

 

Frigates of the Royal Navy
1780 ships
Ships built in Deptford
Maritime incidents in 1807
Shipwrecks in the Caribbean Sea